Canel Konvur (27 November 1939 – 4 June 2018) was a Turkish athlete. She competed in the women's high jump at the 1960 Summer Olympics.

References

External links
 

1939 births
2018 deaths
Athletes (track and field) at the 1960 Summer Olympics
Turkish female high jumpers
Olympic athletes of Turkey
People from Kuşadası